Kid Paddle is an animated television series based on the comic book series of the same name created by Belgian cartoonist Midam.

Synopsis
The cartoon is based on a young boy, named Kid Paddle, a video game enthusiast,  adventures with his two friends Horace and Big Bang.

Production

The show was made in collaboration with M6.

Cast
Jennifer Seguin as Kid Paddle
Daniel Brochu as Big Bang
Eleanor Noble as Horace Becquet
Arthur Holden as Mr. Paddle
Pauline Little as Carole Paddle
Jessica Kardos as Max
A.J. Henderson as Grandpa Paddle

Episodes
Originally, four cartoons were developed for television. Then, an additional 48 episodes were ordered.

Series overview

Season 1 (2003) 

 The first season consists of 52 11-minute episodes or 26 22-minute episodes. The production codes are listed on the show's YouTube channel in French.

Season 2 (2005-2006) 

 The show aired a second season that ran from 2005 to February 19, 2006.

References

External links
 

2003 French television series debuts
2006 French television series endings
French children's animated action television series
French children's animated adventure television series
French-language television shows
2000s American animated television series
2000s French animated television series
Television series based on Belgian comics
Jetix original programming
Teletoon original programming
Animated television series about children
2000s Canadian animated television series
2003 Canadian television series debuts
2006 Canadian television series endings
Canadian children's animated comedy television series
English-language television shows